The Western Collegiate Hockey Association is a college athletic conference which operates in the Midwestern United States. It participates as a women's ice hockey conference in the NCAA's National Collegiate division, the de facto equivalent of Division I in that sport. Founded in 1951 as a men's ice hockey conference, it added a women's division in 1999, and continued to operate men's and women's divisions through the 2020–21 hockey season. After that season, the WCHA disbanded its men's division after seven of its 10 men's members left the conference to reestablish the Central Collegiate Hockey Association; the WCHA remained in operation as a women-only league. Each team plays 28 league games, each team playing four games against every other, two home games and two road games.

The women's WCHA tournament seeds all 8 teams, and conducts a standard 8-team tournament at a single site over 4 days. The winner receives the league's automatic bid to the NCAA Tournament.  WCHA teams won the first 13 NCAA Tournament championships from its inception in 2001.

Championships

By season

By school

Notes

Location of women's WCHA tournaments
2000: Bloomington Ice Garden; Bloomington, Minnesota
2001: Rochester Recreation Center; Rochester, Minnesota
2002: Fogerty Arena; Blaine, Minnesota
2003: Ralph Engelstad Arena; Grand Forks, North Dakota
2004–2007: Ridder Arena; Minneapolis, Minnesota
2008: Duluth Entertainment Convention Center; Duluth, Minnesota
2009–2013: Ridder Arena; Minneapolis, Minnesota
2014: Sanford Center; Bemidji, Minnesota
2015: Ralph Engelstad Arena; Grand Forks, North Dakota
2016–present: Ridder Arena; Minneapolis, Minnesota

Footnotes

References

Champions, women